John King, also known as "King Gizmo", is an American music producer and one-half of the Los Angeles-based duo the Dust Brothers.  As the Dust Brothers, King and Michael "E.Z. Mike" Simpson were noted for their dense sample-based music, notably on the Beastie Boys' 1989 album Paul's Boutique, and later in 1996 with Beck's Odelay.

King teamed with Medeski Martin & Wood to create their 2004 album End of the World Party (Just in Case).

He has also worked with Tenacious D. The Dust Brothers produced their early 2000s releases, Tenacious D and D Fun Pak, and King would return to produce the band's follow-up and soundtrack to their 2006 film, The Pick of Destiny, for which he also wrote the instrumental score. King would also work with Kyle Gass of Tenacious D on his side-project, Trainwreck, this included two Trainwreck releases which would be distributed by Epic Records.

In 2007, King was nominated for an Annie Award (the highest honor given for excellence in animation) for Best Music in an Animated Television Production for his work on the Shorty McShorts' Shorts “Boyz on Da Run” (created by Rob Reger and Brian Brooks)– Walt Disney Television Animation.

In 2008, King received a Grammy for his production and mixing work on Steve Earle's album Washington Square Serenade, which was awarded Best Contemporary Folk / Americana album.

References 

Record producers from California
Living people
Year of birth missing (living people)
Claremont McKenna College alumni